Aristosuchus is a genus of small coelurosaurian dinosaur whose name was derived from the Greek ἄριστος (meaning bravest, best, noblest) and σουχος (the Ancient Greek corruption of the name of the Egyptian crocodile-headed god Sobek). It shared many characteristics with birds.

Discovery 
 
The type species, Aristosuchus pusillus, was described in 1876 by Richard Owen and named Poekilopleuron pusillus. The specific epithet means "small" in Latin. Harry Govier Seeley (1839–1909) gave it the name Aristosuchus in 1887.

It was found in the Wealden Group dating to the Early Cretaceous (Barremian) in England, on the Isle of Wight, i.e. from about 125 million years ago.

Description 
Aristosuchus was a bipedal, meat-eating (carnivorous) theropod dinosaur.

The femur of Aristosuchus has a wing-like anterior trochanter and a markedly reduced fourth trochanter.

Classification 
 
Aristosuchus was originally named as a new species of Poekilopleuron, P. pusillus, from the Wessex Formation of the Isle of Wight. Woodward and Sherborn (1890) regarded Aristosuchus pusillus as being based on the same specimen that Reverend William D. Fox named Calamospondylus oweni in 1866, and many authors followed suit (some regarding C. oweni as a nomen nudum). However, Naish (1999, 2002) showed that Calamospondylus was based on a different specimen than the Aristosuchus holotype based on letters of correspondence between Richard Owen and Reverend Fox as well as discrepancies in the original description.

Naish (1999, 2002) placed Aristosuchus in Compsognathidae. Aristosuchus is known from holotype NHMUK R.178: a sacrum, a pubis, a femur and a few vertebrae. Two ungual phalanges were found nearby, which may have been from the same animal and would suggest long claws.

References

Further reading 
 
 

Compsognathids
Barremian life
Early Cretaceous dinosaurs of Europe
Cretaceous England
Fossils of England
Fossil taxa described in 1876
Taxa named by Harry Seeley